The GR 57 or Vallée de l'Ourthe et Sentier du nord is a GR footpath between Belgium and Luxembourg. About 265 km long, it goes through four regions:

 The city and surroundings of Liège
 The valley of the Ourthe
 The Sûre and the basin of the Rhine
 The Oesling and Gutland

Route
Veille Foulerie (Barchon), Jupille, Liège, Angleur, Tilff, Esneux, Comblain-au-Pont, Durbuy, Hotton, La Roche-en-Ardenne, Houffalize, Gouvy, Troisvierges, Clervaux, Kautenbach, Lipperscheid, Diekirch.

External links
 https://web.archive.org/web/20050404182428/http://www.groteroutepaden.be/grlf/gr/routes/gr57.htm (in Dutch)
 Les Sentiers de Grande Randonnée, GR57 (in French)

Hiking trails in Europe